The 2017–18 season was the eighth in the history of Melbourne City Football Club. In addition to the domestic league, the club competed in the FFA Cup for the fourth time.

On 19 June 2017, Warren Joyce was appointed manager of the club, Joyce having previously managed the Manchester United Reserves, Royal Antwerp and Wigan Athletic. On 7 November 2017, Joe Montemurro left his position as assistant coach of the club to take up the senior coaching position at Arsenal Women.

Players

Transfers

From youth squad

Transfers in

Transfers out

Contract extensions

Technical staff

Pre-season and friendlies

Competitions

Overall record

A-League

League table

Results summary

Results by round

Matches

Finals series

FFA Cup

Statistics

Appearances and goals
Includes all competitions. Players with no appearances not included in the list.

Disciplinary record
Includes all competitions. The list is sorted by squad number when total cards are equal. Players with no cards not included in the list.

Clean sheets
Includes all competitions. The list is sorted by squad number when total clean sheets are equal. Players with no clean sheets not included in the list.

References

External links
 Official Website

Melbourne City
Melbourne City FC seasons